Miss Indonesia is a national beauty pageant in Indonesia.

Miss Indonesia may also refer to:

 Puteri Indonesia, Indonesia's representatives at Miss Universe
 Miss Indonesia Earth, Indonesia's representatives at Miss Earth